William de Ludenton was a Priest in the Roman Catholic Church.

Career
Son of Hugonis de Ludenton he was made vicar of Aylesbury in 1348 by Edmund Beresford, Prebendary of Aylesbury.

References

Sources
 

Year of birth unknown
1361 deaths
14th-century English Roman Catholic priests
People from Aylesbury